Sudharani Raghupathy is a notable Indian classical dancer. She received Padma Shri in 1988 and Central Sangeet Natak Akademi award in 1984.
She is the author of Laghu Bharatam, a handbook for Bharatanatyam Dance. She is the Founder and Trustee of Sree Bharatalaya, Chennai.

References

1944 births
Articles created or expanded during Women's History Month (India) - 2014
Indian female classical dancers
Performers of Indian classical dance
Recipients of the Padma Shri in arts
Living people
20th-century Indian dancers
20th-century Indian women artists
Recipients of the Sangeet Natak Akademi Award
Bharatanatyam exponents